Megachile simonyi is a species of bee in the family Megachilidae. It was described by Heinrich Friese in 1903.

It is found in Yemen and Eritrea. The specific name is named after , who discovered one of the syntypes in Ra's Fartak, Yemen.

References

Simonyi
Insects described in 1903